MM Shahin is a Bangladeshi politician, businessman, journalist, and former parliamentarian. He was elected a member of parliament from the Moulvibazar-2 (Kulaura Upazila) seat in the general elections of February 1996 and 2001.

Early life 
MM Shahin was born on 1 August 1960 at Kulaura Upazila of Moulvibazar district. His father's name was Abdul Rab and his mother's name was Syeda Maheru Rob. Shahin went to West Germany first and then to the United States while studying at the Government Titumir College.

Political life 
Shahin was elected a member of parliament from the Moulvibazar-2 (Kulaura Upazila) seat in the elections of February 1996 and 2001. He was defeated by Nawab Ali Abbas Khan in the 2008 general election. On 15 November 2018, he joined the Bikalpa Dhara. He was defeated in the eleventh parliamentary elections of 2018.

See also 
 List of members of the 8th Jatiya Sangsad

References 

1960 births
Living people
Bikalpa Dhara Bangladesh politicians
Bangladesh Nationalist Front politicians
6th Jatiya Sangsad members
8th Jatiya Sangsad members
People from Kulaura Upazila
Government Titumir College alumni